Brian Alfred Marris (born 1896 or 1897; date of death unknown) was a New Zealand cricketer who played first-class cricket for Wellington from 1917 to 1920.

Brian Marris, known as "Curly", was a leg-spin bowler and useful batsman. He was educated at Wellington College. During World War I he worked in the Army Department’s Base Records Office in Wellington. 

He scored 212 for the Old Boys club in a match of senior Wellington club cricket in December 1917. He made his first-class debut for Wellington against Canterbury a few days later, taking three wickets in each innings and batting in the tail. The next season, when the Plunket Shield resumed, he took 5 for 50 against Canterbury, combining with Syd Hiddleston to dismiss Canterbury for 163 in the first innings, but was expensive and wicketless in the second innings when Canterbury scored 303 for 3 and won by seven wickets.  

Although he gained substantial turn from the pitch, he lacked control. He lost his place in the Wellington side during the 1919-20 season and never regained it.

References

External links
 
 

1890s births
Year of death missing 
New Zealand cricketers
Wellington cricketers
People educated at Wellington College (New Zealand)
New Zealand military personnel of World War I